Fábio André da Silva Monteiro (born 4 March 1990) is a Portuguese footballer who plays in Switzerland for Meyrin.

References

External links 
 Stats at Swiss Football league site
  

1990 births
Portuguese footballers
Living people
Association football goalkeepers
Servette FC players
Urania Genève Sport players
FC Meyrin players
Swiss Challenge League players
Swiss 1. Liga (football) players
2. Liga Interregional players
Portuguese expatriate footballers
Expatriate footballers in Switzerland